Ľuboš Hudák (born 4 November 1968 in Detva) is a Slovak former handball player who competed in the 1992 Summer Olympics.

References

1968 births
Living people
Slovak male handball players
Olympic handball players of Czechoslovakia
Czechoslovak male handball players
Handball players at the 1992 Summer Olympics
People from Detva District
Sportspeople from the Banská Bystrica Region